Sir Michael St Edmund Burton KCVO CMG (born 1937) is a retired British diplomat.

Biography
Born on 18 October 1937, Burton was educated at Bedford School and Magdalen College, Oxford, and joined the Foreign and Commonwealth Office in 1960.

He was British Minister in Berlin, 1985–1992, acting as Deputy Commandant to the British Military Government, 1985–1990, and Head of the British Embassy Office, 1990–1992; Assistant Under-Secretary of State at the Foreign Office (Middle East), 1993; and British Ambassador to the Czech Republic, 1994–1997.

References

External links 
 Interviewed on ANN TV 2016 on the Middle East; The East-West divide; and Brexit

Positions held 

Living people
1937 births
Members of HM Diplomatic Service
Companions of the Order of St Michael and St George
People educated at Bedford School
Alumni of Magdalen College, Oxford
Ambassadors of the United Kingdom to Czechoslovakia
20th-century British diplomats